Cooper Williams (born June 17, 2005) is an American tennis player. He won the Boys' doubles alongside compatriot Learner Tien at the 2023 Australian Open in January 2023.

Early life
Born and raised in New York City, Williams attended St. Bernard's School on the Upper East Side from Kindergarten to seventh grade. He currently attends Dwight School Global, from which he will graduate June 2023. Williams relocated to Boca Raton, Florida during Covid, where he works with fitness coach, Richard Woodruff.

Career
Alongside partner Learner Tien, Williams won the junior Australian Open doubles in January 2023, defeating Alexander Blockx and João Fonseca in the final 6–4, 6–4.

Junior Grand Slam finals

Doubles: 1 (1 title)

References

Living people
2005 births
Sportspeople from New York City
Sportspeople from Connecticut
Grand Slam (tennis) champions in boys' doubles
Australian Open (tennis) junior champions